Color Humano was an Argentine rock group of the early 1970s.

History 
The dissolution of Almendra yielded three new outfits, one of them being Color Humano. This power trio was a solid rock group, which would in 1972 release their debut album Color Humano, following the Argentine rock etiquette of naming the first studio release after the band.

The record is one of those unusual works that do not feature a hit song, but where the entire set of tracks as a whole become a thoroughly enjoyable listen, a mixture of acoustic rock songs and slightly harder edge ones. David Lebón would leave and be replaced by Oscar Moro.

This change would shift the group's sound. Between March and June 1973, Color Humano recorded enough songs for a double album. Due to business decisions the album was released as two separate LPs on the newly created Talent label. The new set of songs were richer and more elaborate, spanning different rhythms and styles.

The albums Color Humano II and Color Humano III would sell well, and included a special participation of Raul Porchetto in several tracks, even as a singer. Yet the band did not do many live performances, which would begin to erode their popular following.

Color Humano's performance at the B.A. Rock Festival would be featured in the movie-documentary on Argentine rock "Rock hasta que se ponga el sol" ("Rock music till the sun goes down"). The band would disband in 1974, with members going on to groups such as Polifemo and La Máquina de Hacer Pájaros. They would celebrate a 20 year reunion in 1995.

Discography 
Singles
"Hombre De Las Cumbres" / "Mañana Por La Noche" (1972)
"A Través De Los Inviernos" / "Hace Casi Dos Mil Años" (1973)
"Coto de caza" / "Las Historias Que Tengo" (1973)
"Vestido De Agua" (1974)

Studio Albums
Color Humano (1972)
Color Humano 2 (1973)
Color Humano 3 (1974)

Live Albums
En el Roxy, live at the Roxy Club (1995)

References

External links
 
 

1971 establishments in Argentina
1974 disestablishments in Argentina
Argentine rock music groups
Musical groups established in 1971
Musical groups disestablished in 1974